Ivy is a former settlement in Modoc County, California.

A post office operated at Ivy from 1899 to 1920 and from 1921 to 1922. The town's name comes from a potted ivy kept at the post office.

Geography

History
During its heyday, Ivy was a sawmill town.

References

External links
Wikimapia

Former settlements in Modoc County, California
Former populated places in California